Malolan Rangarajan (born 22 April 1989) is a former Indian cricketer who played for Tamil Nadu in domestic cricket. He was a bowling all-rounder who batted right-handed and bowled right-arm off break, and has also represented South Zone cricket team. He took a five-for and scored a fifty against West Zone in the 2013/14 Duleep Trophy.

Ahead of the 2018–19 Ranji Trophy, he transferred from Tamil Nadu to Uttarakhand. For the 2019–20 Ranji Trophy, he moved back to Tamil Nadu.

Coaching career
He was appointed as head of scouting for Royal Challengers Bangalore

References

External links

 
 

1989 births
Living people
Indian cricketers
Tamil Nadu cricketers
Uttarakhand cricketers
South Zone cricketers